Z-Maestro is a MIDI and digital audio sequencer designed with a focus on ease of use and power for the Windows platform. Developed by Z-Systems, it has seen over a dozen regular releases spaced two to six months apart.

History
Z-Maestro development began in 2006 in an attempt to introduce a product that could compete with Apple GarageBand for ease of use and professional products like FL Studio and Logic Pro for features. Pre-1.0 releases were released as free betas. Z-Maestro is developed in VB.NET for the Microsoft .NET 3.5 SP1 platform.

Z-Maestro 1.0 was released as the first commercial version on  April 26, 2009 with a price of $30. This first major release still had the prototype interface of the betas. Version 1.1 introduced a newly polished interface similar in style to the Adobe Creative Suite. This new interface is adjustable through the options dialog.

Features
 Sequence instrument (MIDI), drum (MIDI), and audio tracks
 Edit instrument and drum parts in a roll editor
 Edit audio in both a waveform view and a spectrum view
 Apply audio effects destructively in the audio editor or non-destructively to entire audio tracks
 Renders MIDI tracks using SoundFont software instruments
 Edit audio in the audio editor using on-clip controls, including for the spectral view

Free version limitations
Z-Maestro may be downloaded as the free of charge "lite" version, subject to some limitations. The "lite" version may not be used to create commercial works and projects are limited to three tracks. Audio import and export features are also limited to WAV files.

References 

 Snappy Z-Maestro Offers Affordable--but Limited--Audio Editing Review by PCWorld, February 5, 2012.

External links
 Official Z-Maestro page
 Z-Systems website

Digital audio workstation software
MIDI